Gerrit Wegkamp (born 13 April 1993) is a German professional footballer who plays as a striker for Preußen Münster. He previously played for VfL Osnabrück, Fortuna Düsseldorf II, Fortuna Düsseldorf, MSV Duisburg, Bayern Munich II, VfR Aalen, Sportfreunde Lotte and FSV Zwickau.

Club career
Born in Ochtrup, Wegkamp played youth football for SV Suddendorf-Samern and SV Bad Bentheim, before joining VfL Osnabrück where he began his senior career. He impressed for the youth sides at Osnabrück during the 2010–11 season, and made his senior debut for the club on 23 July 2020 in a 1–0 3. Liga victory away to SV Darmstadt 98. His first senior goal came in the next game; a 3–2 DFB-Pokal defeat to TSV 1860 Munich on 29 July 2011. Wegkamp was noted for his potential, and he signed a contract extension until 2014 in September 2011. Wegkamp was a regular player for Osnabrück in the first half of the season, though failed to appear for the club during the second half of the season as a result of a foot injury suffered in January 2012. He made a total of 21 league appearances during the 2011–12 season, scoring four goals.

Having impressed at Osnabrück, Wegkamp joined Bundesliga side Fortuna Düsseldorf on a three-year contract for an undisclosed fee. He initially joined up with the club's reserve side, making his debut for Fortuna Düsseldorf II on 17 August 2012 in a 1–0 defeat to Sportfreunde Lotte, and scored his first goal for them on 22 September 2012 in a 2–1 victory away to SC Verl. Across the season, he made three appearances in the Bundesliga for Fortuna Düsseldorf, the first being as a substitute in a 3–2 defeat away to Bayer 04 Leverkusen on 4 November 2012, and 23 league appearances for Fortuna Düsseldorf II, scoring four. After 3 first team appearances for Fortuna in the first half of the 2013–14 season, before joining 3. Liga side MSV Duisburg on loan on the final day of the January transfer window. He made 15 appearances for Duisburg, though did not score. In the summer of 2014, Wegkamp left Düsseldorf, joining Bayern Munich II. He made 34 appearances for them across the 2014–15 season, scoring 15.

In August 2015, Wegkamp signed for newly relegated 2. Bundesliga side VfR Aalen after 5 appearances for Bayern Munich II. His first appearance for the club came on  He suffered a foot injury in April 2016, ruling him out for Aalen's last few games of the season. He made his debut for the club on 30 August 2015 in a 1–1 draw at home to Hansa Rostock, and scored his first goal for them in the following match; a 56th minute finish to round off the scoring in a 4–0 victory away to Energie Cottbus and was praised for his performance. He made 25 appearances for Aalen, scoring three and assisting three goals across the 2015–16 season as his season was cut short through injury in April 2016.

The 2016–17 saw more consistent performances from Wegkamp, scoring 11 goals in 37 appearances as Aalen finished 11th despite a 9-point deduction. With his contract set to expire in the summer of 2017, he signed a two-year contract extension following the end of the 2016–17 season. He made 33 appearances for Aalen, scoring twice across the 2017–18 season as Aalen finished 12th on 50 points.

On 31 August 2018, the last day of the German transfer window, Wegkamp joined 3. Liga club Sportfreunde Lotte on a two-year contract after 5 appearances for Aalen that season. His first appearance came the following day in a 3–1 victory away to Karlsruher SC as he would make 33 appearances for Lotte across the 2018–19 season, scoring twice.

Wegkamp signed for 3. Liga club FSV Zwickau on a two-year contract in the summer of 2019. He made his debut for the club on 20 July 2019 and scored the opening goal as Zwickau defeated SV Meppen 2–0.

In December 2020 it was announced Wegkamp would terminate his contract with FSV Zwickau and join Regionalliga West club SC Preußen Münster in January 2021.

International career
Between 2011 and 2012, Wegkamp made three appearances for the Germany national under-19 football team, scoring once.

Career statistics

References

1993 births
Living people
German footballers
People from Ochtrup
Sportspeople from Münster (region)
Footballers from North Rhine-Westphalia
Association football forwards
Germany youth international footballers
VfL Osnabrück players
Fortuna Düsseldorf II players
Fortuna Düsseldorf players
MSV Duisburg players
FC Bayern Munich II players
VfR Aalen players
Sportfreunde Lotte players
FSV Zwickau players
SC Preußen Münster players
Bundesliga players
2. Bundesliga players
3. Liga players
Regionalliga players